The University of Northern New Jersey (UNNJ) was a fake university created and maintained by the United States Department of Homeland Security from 2013 to 2016 to investigate student visa fraud. It claimed to be based in Cranford, New Jersey, with plans to expand to Harrison, Hoboken, and Morristown.

Background
The UNNJ sting operation took place following several high-profile student visa fraud cases involving phony universities, most notably Tri-Valley University in Northern California, an institution that offered classes but did not require students to attend.

History of the sting operation
The operation was created in September 2013 by Homeland Security Investigations (HSI), a directorate of U.S. Immigration and Customs Enforcement (ICE).

The fake university had an extensive internet presence, including an elaborate website with a .edu domain name, a crest (bearing a remarkable similarity to that of Princeton University) with a Latin motto, and a Facebook presence led by the university's "president"—a "carefully crafted character" named Dr. Steven Brunetti who had a LinkedIn page. The sting included a fictitious campus at 25 Commerce Drive, Cranford, New Jersey. At the end of the operation, the rented space at 25 Commerce Drive was vacated and the website went down.

The fake university was recognized by the State of New Jersey and was accredited by the Accrediting Commission of Career Schools and Colleges (ACCSC). The director of the ACCSC stated that it had accredited the "university" to cooperate with the federal investigation.

In April 2016, Paul J. Fishman, the U.S. Attorney for the District of New Jersey, and Sarah R. Saldaña, the director of ICE, announced that the sting operation had ended with the arrests of 21 people. Federal agents posed as university officials and worked with the 21 arrested individuals, who were brokers who recruited international students, mostly from China and India, to go to UNNJ. According to federal authorities, the brokers knew that UNNJ did not offer real classes yet "charged the students in a scheme that allowed them to maintain their student visas and stay in the country" and in some cases illegally arranged for jobs and work visas. According to Saldaña, the brokers arranged student visas for 1,076 people, most of whom will have their visas revoked. The authorities described the brokers as engaging in illicit "pay to stay" visa scam.

Effects
The New York Times reported that, "in interviews, more than a dozen students insisted that they were collateral damage in the sting operation, duped by both the brokers and the government." The students said that they had been deceived by the government through "in-person meetings with the university's supposed president, letters confirming they could work instead of go to class, and Twitter messages about classes canceled because of bad weather."

Rachael Merola, a senior researcher at the Observatory on Borderless Higher Education, said that the U.S. government's establishment of a fake university was a "novel strategy" in combating student visa fraud. Merola said that the strategy was highly effective but would likely not be replicated in the future, stating: "If anything, the massive amount of coverage that this got would sound an alarm and might act as a deterrent in the future to unscrupulous agents and sham universities." Ultimately, the scheme was replicated a mere two years later with the equally fictitious University of Farmington.

Class Action Litigation and Settlement 
On May 3, 2022, the U.S. District Court for the District of New Jersey granted final approval to a class-action settlement for all students who enrolled in UNNJ for any length of time, plus their spouses and children. The settlement reverses many of the immigration-related harms suffered by members of the class.

The settlement follows a decision by a federal appeals court that the students had a right to judicial review of the Government's decision to terminate their student status and take other adverse immigration action against them.

See also
 Reagan National University
 University of Farmington
 Entrapment

Notes

References

Fictional universities and colleges
Confidence tricks
U.S. Immigration and Customs Enforcement
Education scandals
Law enforcement operations in the United States
2013 in the United States